Adam Nowodworski (1572–1634) was a Roman Catholic Polish bishop of Kamieniec (1614–1627), bishop of Przemyśl (1627–1631) and bishop of Poznań (1631–1634).

Biography
On  26 Apr 1615, he was consecrated bishop by Benedetto Giustiniani, Cardinal-Bishop of Palestrina, with Attilio Amalteo, Titular Archbishop of Athenae, and Ascanio Gesualdo, Archbishop of Bari-Canosa, serving as co-consecrators.

References

1573 births
1634 deaths
Bishops of Przemyśl
Bishops of Poznań
17th-century Roman Catholic bishops in the Polish–Lithuanian Commonwealth